Tyler Ternowski (born February 25, 1998) is a professional Canadian football wide receiver for the Hamilton Tiger-Cats of the Canadian Football League (CFL).

University career
Ternowski played U Sports football for the Waterloo Warriors from 2016 to 2019. Over the course of his university career, he played in 29 games and recorded 164 receptions for 2,949 yards and 26 touchdowns. He was named a U Sports First Team All-Canadian in 2018 and 2019 and he set an OUA record for most receiving touchdowns in a single season with 14 in 2018.

Professional career
Ternowski was drafted in the third round, 27th overall by the Hamilton Tiger-Cats in the 2020 CFL Draft, but did not play in 2020 due to the cancellation of the 2020 CFL season. He then signed with the team on January 21, 2021. Ternowski made the team's active roster following training camp in 2021 and played in his first career professional game on August 5, 2021, against the Winnipeg Blue Bombers. He played primarily as a backup receiver and on special teams, but he recorded his first career catch, for 48 yards, against the Edmonton Elks, on October 29, 2021. He played in all 14 regular season games and had two catches for 56 yards and four special teams tackles.

References

External links
 Tiger-Cats bio
 

1998 births
Living people
Canadian football wide receivers
Hamilton Tiger-Cats players
Players of Canadian football from Ontario
Sportspeople from Hamilton, Ontario
Waterloo Warriors football players